William Elwood Sterling (February 7, 1927 - June 28, 2005) was an American Episcopalian bishop who served as the 6th suffragan bishop of the Episcopal Diocese of Texas from September 1989 to February 1999.

Early life and education
Sterling was born on February 7, 1927, in Houston, Texas, to Norman Sterling and Mabel Hewitt. Both of his parents died in their hundreds, his father at the age of 102, and his mother at the age of 104. He was educated at the San Jacinto High School in Houston, after which he served in the US Navy during World War II. After the war he resumed his education and studied at the University of Houston and graduating in 1949 with a Bachelor of Arts in management. He then worked as a Bank teller at the Houston Branch of the Federal Reserve Bank of Dallas and later as a safety engineer and payroll auditor for the American Surety Company of Houston. After some time he was employed as a manufacturer's representative of hotel and restaurant supplies by Raleigh W. Johnson Company. Sterling left the world of business and enrolled in a theology course at the Seminary of the Southwest from where he graduated in 1957.

Ordained Ministry
Sterling was ordained deacon on June 18, 1957, and priest on June 19, 1958, by Suffragan Bishop James Clements of Texas. He initially was in charge of St Mark's Church in Rosenberg, Texas, and Grace Church in Houston. Between 1960 and 1966, he was rector of St Paul's Church in Freeport, Texas, while from 1966 until 1977, he served as vicar of Church of the Good Shepherd in Friendswood, Texas. In 1977, Good Shepherd became a parish church and he thus became its first rector, a position he held until 1989. He also held a number of diocesan positions.

Bishop 
On May 5, 1989, Sterling was elected Suffragan Bishop of Texas on the seventh ballot and was consecrated on September 9, 1989, by Presiding Bishop Edmond L. Browning.  He remained in office until his retirement in February 1999. He then became Bishop-in-Residence at Trinity  Church in Houston, and served there until his death on June 28, 2005, as a result of cancer.

References 

1927 births
2005 deaths
20th-century American Episcopalians
Episcopal bishops of Texas
20th-century American clergy
University of Houston alumni
Seminary of the Southwest alumni